Calathus carvalhoi is a species of ground beetle from the Platyninae subfamily that is endemic to the Azores.

References

carvalhoi
Beetles described in 1986
Endemic arthropods of the Azores
Beetles of Europe